The Bedworth Civic Hall was a multi-purpose entertainment venue in the town centre of Bedworth, Warwickshire, England.

The centrepiece of the venue was a 763-seat hall, other facilities included a gallery, meeting rooms, a bistro, a coffee bar and a small hall. It was owned and managed by Nuneaton and Bedworth Borough Council.

The facility was opened in September 1973. In 2004, the hall underwent a major refurbishment costing £1.4 million. The facility permanently closed in October 2022 and is set to be demolished under regeneration plans launched by Nuneaton and Bedworth Borough Council

In 1990, the world famous opera singer Luciano Pavarotti sang here as a rehearsal with the City of Birmingham Symphony Orchestra.

Other notable acts to have performed at the venue include Lenny Henry, Billy Ocean, Pam Ayres, Billy Fury, AC/DC, Ken Dodd, Morecambe and Wise, The Drifters, Larry Grayson, Norman Wisdom and Cilla Black.

In 2021, the hall was used as a vaccination centre during the COVID-19 pandemic. In October 2022, it was announced that the theatre had permanently closed and that it would be demolished. The announcement received a negative reception from residents and visitors, who have started and signed petitions in a bid to keep the venue open.

References

External links
Official website

Bedworth
Theatres in Warwickshire
Culture in Warwickshire
1973 establishments in England